Troitsky is a rural locality (a khutor) in Mikhaylovka Urban Okrug, Volgograd Oblast, Russia. The population was 1,659 as of 2010. There are 28 streets.

Geography 
Troitsky is located 33 km northwest of Mikhaylovka. Rekonstruktsiya is the nearest rural locality.

References 

Rural localities in Mikhaylovka urban okrug